Glischrochilus quadrisignatus, known generally as four-spotted sap beetle, is a species of sap-feeding beetle in the family Nitidulidae. Other common names include the beer bug and picnic beetle. It is found in North America.

References

Further reading

External links

 

Nitidulidae
Beetles described in 1835